The Portfolio Committee on Cooperative Governance and Traditional Affairs (formerly the Portfolio Committee on Provincial and Local Government) is a portfolio committee of the National Assembly of the Parliament of South Africa.

The committee is responsible for oversight of the Department of Cooperative Governance and Traditional Affairs as well as other statutory entities, such as the Commission for the Promotion and Protection of the Rights of Cultural, Religious and Linguistic Communities, the Municipal Demarcation Board, the Municipal Infrastructure Support Agent, the National House of Traditional Leaders, the SA Cities Network and the South African Local Government Association.

Membership
As of August 2021, ANC MP Fikile Xasa serves as chairman of the committee. The membership of the committees is as follows:

References

External links
People's Assembly website

 
Committees of the National Assembly of South Africa